Marjo is a popular female given name in Finland, originated as a variant of the name Marja. Its name day is celebrated on 19 August. As of 2012, more than 12,400 people in Finland have this name. It was most popular in the second half of the 20th century.

Notable people

 Marjo van der Knaap (born 1958), Dutch neurologist
 Marjo Matikainen-Kallström (born 1965), Finnish politician and former cross-country skier
 Marjo-Riikka Mäkelä (born 1977), Finnish stage and independent film actress and director
 Marjo Voutilainen (born 1981), Finnish hockey player
 Marjo Yli-Kiikka (born 1978), Finnish sports shooter
 Marjo Hippi (born 1978), Finnish curler from Helsinki
Marjo van der Mark, Dutch water polo player

See also
 Marja (name)
 Marjoe
 Marjoe Gortner

References

Finnish feminine given names
Dutch feminine given names